F Troop is a satirical American television sitcom that originally aired for two seasons on ABC. The first episode aired on September 14, 1965, and the final episode aired on April 6, 1967. There were 65 episodes in all, 34 in black and white (season 1) and 31 in color (season 2).

Series overview

Episodes

Season 1 (1965–66)

Season 2 (1966–67)

References

External links
 
 

Lists of American sitcom episodes
Lists of American Western (genre) television series episodes